Jelle Wagenaar (born 30 August 1989 in Ureterp) is a Dutch professional footballer who plays as a defender and who is currently without a club. He formerly played for SC Veendam.

External links
 Voetbal International

1989 births
Living people
Dutch footballers
SC Veendam players
Eerste Divisie players
People from Opsterland
Association football fullbacks
Footballers from Friesland